Zengcheng District (alternately romanized as Tsengshing) is one of 11 urban districts of the prefecture-level city of Guangzhou, the capital of Guangdong Province, China.

History
 was established under the Qin following their conquest of the area, formerly held by the Baiyue tribes. Under the Ming, the northern area of the county was separated to form Longmen County, administered from Huizhou. The county was promoted to city status in 1993. In 2006, a western section of Zengcheng was severed to form Guangzhou's Luogang District, which was renamed Huangpu in 2014. On 12 February of the same year, Zengcheng was annexed to Guangzhou as a district. A riot of migrant workers occurred in Zengcheng in 2011.

Climate
Zengcheng's mild climate, fertile land, annual average temperature of 22.02 degrees and average yearly rainfall of  make it suitable for tropical and subtropical crop growth. The district is noted for production of the lychee.

Administrative divisions
There are currently 6 subdistricts and 7 towns.

On 28 August 2012 one new subdistrict (Yongning) and one new town (Xiancun) were established from carving out of Xintang.

Tourist attractions
Twin Dragon Resort opened to public in December 2014. The resort has a total area of 163 acres, and it consists of two theme parks, East Village and West Village. Located in the heart of Erlongshan subtropical rainforest, Twin Dragon Resort has exceptional natural resources and marvelous landscapes. To experience traditional Chinese culture, Twin Dragon Resort also offers a variety of family activities and events, suitable for visitors of all ages to participate.

Demography
Owing to the distance from Guangzhou's city center, many locals consider themselves distinct from the other Guangzhounese. They also speak separate Yue and Hakka dialects.

Education

Colleges
Guangdong University of Technology Huali College
Guangzhou University Songtian College
Guangdong University of Finance & Economics Huashang College
Guangzhou Kangda Vocational Technical College

International schools
Utahloy International School Zengcheng

Notable people:
 Zhan Ruo Shui (湛若水)：male philosopher of Ming dynasty
 Leung kwok Hung (梁國雄)：Hong Kong male politician
 Hélène Wong (黃喜蓮)：female Chinese new Zealander writer, her publishing includes being Chinese: My Own Story

Notes

References

External links
Official website of Zengcheng Government
Weather-forecast in Zengcheng

 
Districts of Guangzhou